Chen Linong (born October 3, 2000) is a Taiwanese singer and actor active in mainland China. He took part in the Chinese survival show Idol Producer and debuted as a member of Chinese boy group Nine Percent as a vocalist. He released his first album 'Unbelonging' on May 29, 2020.

Personal life 
Chen was born in Kaohsiung, Taiwan where he was scouted by A Legend Star Entertainment Corp. and trained for a period of 6 months before travelling to mainland China.

In March 2021, Chen announced support for cotton from Xinjiang in mainland China, after some companies had expressed concerns about human rights abuses. Chen was also part of a large group of Taiwanese celebrities active in mainland China who expressed support for unification of Taiwan by the PRC government.

Career

2018-2019: Idol Producer and debut
In 2018, Linong participated in the reality show called Idol Producer as a trainee under A Legend Star Corporation. He rose to fame after being on the show and ended up placing 2nd in the final episode with a total of 20,441,802 votes. He officially debuted on April 6, 2018 with the group Nine Percent.

After the ending of the show, Chen went on to release 2 songs and was voted the 6th Most Influential Star in China from May to June 2018 with fellow Nine Percent members Cai Xukun, Fan Chengcheng and Zhu Zhengting placing respectively at 1st, 7th and 8th.

Chen released a single titled "I Am Yours (我是你的)" on October 3, 2018. He also released another song titled "Half of it is Me (一半是我)" on January 1, 2019.

On October 6, 2019 Nine Percent officially disbanded. They held their final farewell concert on October 12 in Guangzhou, China.

On October 31, 2019 he released a single titled "Exclusive Contract (专属合约)". The MV teaser for the song dropped on November 4, with the MV coming out on November 11.

2020-Present: First full length album and movie role 
On May 29, 2020  Chen released his first full-length album "Un-belonging (格格不入)". The album contains 12 songs, two being collaborations with fellow singers, Hailee Steinfeld and Lala Hsu. Since its release it has been confirmed to have achieved a double diamond certification by QQ Music, with over 500,000 albums sold on the platform. An official UMGC press release stated that the album "reached diamond status within one-minute of release", generating more than 4.5 million individual track sales within its first 12 hours on sale.

On December 4, 2020 A fantasy movie titled Soul Snatcher was released (in China). In which he played one of the main characters, Wang Zijin, alongside his co-star Li Xian. The movie earned $19,500,000 at the Chinese box office.

Discography

Albums

Singles

Soundtrack appearances

Filmography

Films

Television Shows

Awards and nominations

Notelist

References

External links 

 
 
 
 

2000 births
Living people
People from Kaohsiung
Idol Producer contestants
Nine Percent members
21st-century Taiwanese singers
21st-century Taiwanese male actors
Taiwanese male singers
Taiwanese male film actors